This is a list of earthquakes in 1914. Only magnitude 6.0 or greater earthquakes appear on the list. Lower magnitude events are included if they have caused death, injury or damage. Events which occurred in remote areas will be excluded from the list as they wouldn't have generated significant media interest. All dates are listed according to UTC time. A fairly busy year with 17 events exceeding magnitude 7. The largest of these was a magnitude 8.1 in Indonesia in May. The deadliest event of the year was in Turkey in October with 4,000 deaths. Several other events resulted in sizable death tolls. Italy, Dutch East Indies and Japan were affected.

Overall

By death toll 

 Note: At least 10 casualties

By magnitude 

 Note: At least 7.0 magnitude

Notable events

January

February

March

April

May

June

July

August

September

October

November

December

References

1914
 
1914